Alex Stamos is a Greek American computer scientist and adjunct professor at Stanford University's Center for International Security and Cooperation. He is the former chief security officer (CSO) at Facebook. His planned departure from the company, following disagreement with other executives about how to address the Russian government's use of its platform to spread disinformation during the 2016 U.S. presidential election, was reported in March 2018.

Early life 
Stamos grew up in Fair Oaks, California and graduated from Bella Vista High School in 1997. Stamos attended the University of California, Berkeley, where he graduated in 2001 with a degree in EECS.

Career 
Stamos began his career at Loudcloud and, later, as a security consultant at @stake.

iSEC Partners 
In 2004, Stamos co-founded iSEC Partners, a security consulting firm, with Joel Wallenstrom, Himanshu Dwivedi, Jesse Burns and Scott Stender. During his time at iSEC Partners, Stamos was well known for his research publications on vulnerabilities in forensics software and MacOS, Operation Aurora, and security ethics in the post-Snowden era.

Stamos was an expert witness for a number of cases involving digital privacy, encryption, and free speech:

 EFF for their lawsuit against Sony BMG
 Google for their Google Street View case
 George Hotz
 Aaron Swartz

iSEC Partners was acquired by NCC Group in 2010.

Artemis Internet 
Following the acquisition of iSEC Partners by NCC Group, Stamos became the CTO of Artemis Internet, an internal startup at NCC Group. Artemis Internet petitioned ICANN to host a '.secure' gTLD on which all services would be required to meet minimum security standards Artemis ultimately acquired the right to operate the '.trust' gTLD from Deutsche Post to launch its services.

Stamos filed and received five patents for his work at Artemis Internet.

Yahoo! 
In 2014, Stamos joined Yahoo! as CSO. While at Yahoo!, he testified to Congress on online advertising and its impact on computer security and data privacy. He publicly challenged NSA Director Michael S. Rogers on the subject of encryption backdoors in February 2015 at a cybersecurity conference hosted by New America.

Facebook 
In 2015, Stamos joined Facebook as CSO. During his time at Facebook, Stamos co-authored a whitepaper (with Jen Weedon and Will Nuland) on the use of social media to attack elections. He later delivered a keynote address at the Black Hat Briefings in 2017 on the need to broaden the definition of security and diversify the cybersecurity industry.

Following disagreement with other executives about how to address the Russian government's use of its platform to spread disinformation during the 2016 U.S. presidential election, he made plans in 2018 to leave the company to take a research professorship at Stanford University.

Stamos was interviewed about the Russian interference in the 2016 United States elections in the PBS Frontline documentary The Facebook Dilemma.

Controversies 
During Stamos's tenure as the Chief Security Officer, Facebook was involved in numerous safety and security controversies including the Russian interference in the 2016 United States elections, failure to remove reported child-abuse images, 
inaction against disinformation campaigns in Philippines that targeted and harassed journalists,

Facebook–Cambridge Analytica data scandal and the Rohingya genocide, for which the company has played a "determining role" according to the UN.
Stamos said, as the CSO during the 2016 election season he "deserve as much blame (or more) as any other exec at the company," 
for Facebook's failed response to the Russian interference.
Although the whitepaper Stamos coauthored
only mentioned $100,000 ad spend for 3,000 ads connected to about 470 inauthentic accounts, it was later revealed that
the Russian influence had reached 126 million Facebook users.
While Cambridge Analytica harvested data from 87 million Facebook users before Stamos's tenure, Facebook did not notify its users until 2018, despite knowing about it as early as 2015, the year Stamos joined the company as the CSO. In July 2019, Facebook agreed to pay $100 million to settle with the U.S. Securities and Exchange Commission
for misleading investors for more than two years (2015-2018) about the misuse of its users' data.

Stanford University 
, Stanford University's Center for International Security and Cooperation lists Stamos as an adjunct professor, visiting scholar at the Hoover Institution, and director of the Stanford Internet Observatory.

Krebs Stamos Group 
At the beginning of 2021, Stamos joined former CISA director Chris Krebs to form Krebs Stamos Group, a cybersecurity consultancy, which quickly landed its first customer, the recently-beleaguered SolarWinds.

References

Patents 

  Securing client connections, filed April 11, 2012, granted July 14, 2015
  Domain policy specification and enforcement, filed April 11, 2012, granted August 5, 2014
  Computing resource policy regime specification and verification, filed May 9, 2014, granted August 11, 2014
  Assessing a computing resource for compliance with a computing resource policy regime specification, filed May 9, 2014, granted March 24, 2015
  Discovery engine, filed May 9, 2014, granted February 16, 2016

External links 
 Alex Stamos on Twitter
 Krebs Stamos Group official web site

Year of birth missing (living people)
Chief security officers
Facebook employees
Living people
MSNBC people
Place of birth missing (living people)
People associated with computer security
University of California, Berkeley alumni
Yahoo! employees